Ernest Otton Wilimowski (born Ernst Otto Prandella; 23 June 1916 – 30 August 1997), nicknamed "Ezi", was a footballer who played as a forward. He ranks among the best goalscorers in the history of both the Poland national team and Polish club football. After re-taking German citizenship following the invasion of Poland, he also played for the Germany national team.

Wilimowski was the first player to score four goals in a single FIFA World Cup game. According to RSSSF, Wilimowski scored over 1077 total goals in at least 688 total matches, making him the 14th greatest goalscorer of all time. He is the most prolific goalscorer in official matches in one season in recorded history according to RSSSF, with 107 goals scored in 45 matches.

Wilimowski also occasionally played ice hockey for the team Pogoń Katowice.

Early life
Born in Kattowitz (Katowice), Prussian Silesia, German Empire, Wilimowski was raised in a Silesian family, typical of the Upper Silesian Polish-German borderland. After eastern Upper Silesia became part of Poland in 1922, he became a citizen of the Second Polish Republic.

His parents, Ernst-Roman and Paulina, were German. His father, a soldier for the German Empire, died on the Western Front in the First World War. His mother sent him to a German kindergarten, a German primary school and, when he was nine years old, to the German football team 1. FC Kattowitz. At the age of 13, he was legally adopted by his stepfather, who was Polish, and took on the surname Wilimowski. At home, he spoke German for the most part, while in public he often spoke a Silesian dialect of the Polish language. Officially a citizen of Poland, he referred to himself as a Upper Silesian ("Górnoślązak" - Oberschlesier).

Early career

Ruch Chorzów
Wilimowski, who had six toes on his right foot, played on the left side as a forward and showed himself to be a very skilled dribbler as well as a natural goalscorer. He began his career with the ethnically German club 1. FC Kattowitz, then in 1933 at the age of 17, moved to Polish side Ruch Wielkie Hajduki, today known as Ruch Chorzów. "Ezi" quickly established himself as the team's best player: in his first season he scored 33 goals to lead the league. His first Ekstraklasa game took place on 8 April 1934, a few weeks later, he capped for Polish national team. With a number of excellent footballers besides Wilimowski (for example Teodor Peterek and Gerard Wodarz), Ruch dominated the Polish soccer and was the league champion in 1933–1936 and 1938.

Wilimowski played 86 games for Ruch, scoring 112 goals, and was the league's top scorer in 1934 and 1936. He also led the league in scoring in 1939 until the German invasion of Poland. On 21 May 1939, he scored 10 goals in a single match against Union Touring Łódź as his club won 12–1. That performance still stands as a league record.

Polish national team
Soon after beginning his club football career, "Ezi" earned his first cap for Poland when he debuted against Denmark in Copenhagen on 21 May 1934 in a 2:4 loss: he was just 17 years and 332 days old. In a total of 22 appearances for Poland, Wilimowski netted 21 goals, nearly a goal per game. However, his off field conduct was less than ideal and in 1936 the young man's penchant for drinking and partying led to a one-year suspension imposed by the Polish football association just before the Olympic Games in Berlin. Without his goal scoring touch the Poles managed only a fourth-place finish in the Olympic tournament. Many felt that his presence could have brought the team a gold medal.

Wilimowski's appearances for Poland include two performances that were both historic and memorable.

In a match against Brazil played in Strasbourg, France during the 1938 FIFA World Cup, "Ezi" put on a stunning display by becoming the first player ever to score four goals in a single World Cup match. His continued attacks on the opposition net also drew a penalty as he was fouled to the ground by Brazilian keeper Batatais, which led to Poland's fifth goal scored from the spot by German-born Fritz Scherfke, from Poznań. However, it was not enough - Poland lost the match 6–5 and was eliminated from the tournament. Wilimowski's record was later equalled by other players, but was bettered only 56 years later, when Oleg Salenko scored five goals against Cameroon during the 1994 FIFA World Cup. It still remains the only World Cup match when a player from the losing side scored four goals.

Wilimowski put on another memorable display on 27 August 1939 in Warsaw in an international friendly against what was then one of the best teams in the world - Hungary, the 1938 World Cup runner-up. After 33 minutes of play the Hungarians were ahead 2:0. Wilimowski scored three goals and again drew a penalty through his attacking play which was converted by teammate Leonard Piątek, giving Poland a 4:2 win. The match was the last game played before the start of World War II just four days later.

War years
After the invasion and occupation of Poland by Nazi Germany, Wilimowski as Volksdeutscher re-took German citizenship, like the majority of the inhabitants of the Eastern part of Upper Silesia, among them all the players of the Polish national team coming from this region. It allowed them to continue their football careers as Poles were not permitted to participate in sports under the Nazi occupation. In the early days of the war Wilimowski had to hide from the Nazis because of the enmity of a local Kreisleiter (county leader) of the NSDAP named Georg Joschke who held against Wilimowski the 1933 transfer from the ethnically-German club 1. FC Kattowitz to the Polish Ruch Chorzów. Allegedly, Joschke threatened that Wilimowski would have to wear the letter "P" (for Pole) on his clothes. This never happened, as Wilimowski was too good a player and well appreciated by other German football officials. However, his mother Paulina, was placed in Auschwitz concentration camp, which she survived. Wilimowski's mother was incarcerated because she got engaged in an intimate relationship with a Russian Jew, which was regarded as Rassenschande in Nazi Germany. Ernst, who in later stages of the war became friends with legendary pilot Hermann Graf, managed to save her, with Graf's help.

For propaganda purposes, Nazi sports officials made 1. FC Kattowitz a model side representative of the German Upper Silesia. The region's best players were assigned to the team and besides Wilimowski included Erwin Nyc, Ewald Dytko and Paweł Cyganek. "Ezi" played there until February 1940, before moving on to Chemnitz, where he took up a job as a policeman while playing for the local team Polizei-Sportverein Chemnitz (1940–1942).

Through the course of the war, he also played for TSV 1860 Munich (1942–1944), where he was a member of the Tschammerpokal (German Cup) winning side of 1942. In the final game of the 1942 German Cup, at the Olympic Stadium in Berlin, the Munich side won 2–0, with the first goal scored by Wilimowski. In the final years of the war, Wilimowski became a soldier of the Wehrmacht, but he was allowed to play in army football teams, f.e. LSV Mölders in German-occupied Kraków.

Germany national team
Like other officials, Sepp Herberger, manager of the Germany national team, developed an immediate appreciation for Wilimowski's talent. He debuted for Germany against Romania on 1 June 1941, in Bucharest scoring twice in a 4–1 victory. He followed that performance with three goals against Finland in Helsinki on 5 October 1941 as the Germans scored an easy 6–0 win.

The only international match Wilimowski ever played in his native Upper Silesia (in Beuthen, now Bytom, Poland), whether wearing a Polish or German jersey, was on 16 August 1942 versus the Romanian side. He contributed one goal in a 7–0 win (another German star, Fritz Walter, netted three goals in the contest). The match was the biggest sporting event staged there during the war as 55,000 fans came to cheer on their native son.

Wilimowski's most memorable performance for the German national side came on 18 October 1942 in Bern, Switzerland as the Germans defeated a well-respected Swiss national team by a score of 5-3. "Ezi" scored four of five goals with the other being netted by Fritz Walter.

Wilimowski was capped a total of eight times for Germany, scoring 13 goals (1.63 per match). His last appearance for Germany was in a 5–2 victory over Slovakia in Bratislava on 22 November 1942. After this match, Germany no longer played international friendlies because of the war.

Postwar career
After the war, Wilimowski, who was regarded by the Polish government as a traitor, was not allowed to visit his Silesian homeland during the Communist regime. He was with SG Chemnitz-West in 1946-47 and had a short spell with RC Strasbourg in 1949. After that, he settled in the Karlsruhe area, opening a restaurant there. Even though he was already in his 30s when organized playing resumed, he continued a career that lasted until 1959 and age 43. During this period he played for, or had talks with, several German club teams including TSV Detmold (in between seasons, no league appearances), FV Offenburg (as a player-coach), BC Augsburg for a short spell in the autumn of 1948, Singen 04, where he had a good comeback scoring 16 Oberliga goals in 1950-51, and VfR Kaiserslautern (including 70 goals in 89 Oberliga Südwest appearances for the latter, all scored when he was over 35 years old). After retiring, together with wife, Wilimowski for a while ran a restaurant, then worked in a Pfaff sewing machine factory, to retire in 1978.

At the 1974 FIFA World Cup in Germany, Wilimowski allegedly wanted to pay a visit to the Polish national team that stayed in Murrhardt near Stuttgart, but was refused permission by PZPN officials. In 1995, he was invited by Ruch Chorzów to come to Upper Silesia and celebrate club's 75th anniversary. Wilimowski, according to his oldest daughter, Sylvia Haarke, wanted to come to Poland, saying that had it not been for the war, he would never have left Katowice. However, his wife Klara (née Mehne) was sick then and he had to stay with her. Wilimowski died in Karlsruhe, Germany, leaving behind four children - three daughters (Sylvia, Sigrid and Ulle) and a son, Rainer.

Sylvia Haarke who lives in Hamburg, and in May 2007 visited Tarnowskie Góry with her husband Karl-Heinz Haarke (author of Wilimowski's biography), presented some interesting facts about her father. She said that Wilimowski was a devout Roman Catholic, always emphasizing the role of religion in his life. After the famous Poland v Brazil (1938) game, Brazilian officials wanted to acquire his services. Wilimowski had signed a preliminary contract, but it did not work out. According to Haarke, one of her father's biggest disappointments was not having been a member of the German team which won the 1954 FIFA World Cup.

Legendary coach of the Polish national team, Kazimierz Górski, met Wilimowski at a hotel in Murrhardt during the World Championship in Germany in 1974. Gorski immediately recognized Ezi, because in the interbellum period, Wilimowski was one of his idols. Whenever Ruch Chorzow came to play in Lwów (now Lviv), Gorski always attended the games, watching Wilimowski. However, being observed by an agent of the Polish secret police SB, the Polish coach greeted his idol very coldly: Mr Wilimowski, if you had not done anything wrong, perhaps you should have come back to Poland, and explain your behavior, cleanse yourself of all charges - said Górski. I was afraid - answered Wilimowski.

Career statistics

Club

International 

 Wilimowski's team's score listed first, score column indicates score after each Wilimowski goal.

Literature
Karl-Heinz Harke, Georg Kachel; Fußball – Sport ohne Grenzen. Die Lebensgeschichte des Fußball-Altnationalspielers Ernst Willimowski., Dülmen, Laumann-Verlag 1996, 
Thomas Urban: Schwarze Adler, weiße Adler. Deutsche und polnische Fußballer im Räderwerk der Politik. Göttingen 2011, pp. 28–48.

See also
 List of men's footballers with 500 or more goals

References

External links
 
 
Biography 
O występach Ernesta Wilimowskiego w reprezentacji Niemiec 
Press article about Sylvia Haarke's visit to Poland and her stories about her father 
 
DFB.de on Willimowski

1916 births
1997 deaths
Sportspeople from Katowice
German footballers
Dual internationalists (football)
Polish footballers
Ruch Chorzów players
Chemnitzer FC players
TSV 1860 Munich players
FC Augsburg players
Ekstraklasa players
1938 FIFA World Cup players
Germany international footballers
Poland international footballers
People from the Province of Silesia
Offenburger FV players
Association football forwards
German Army personnel of World War II
West German footballers
Polish emigrants to West Germany